Sam Querrey was the defending champion, but lost to Mardy Fish in the quarterfinals.

Andy Roddick won his third title at this event, and the 30th of his career, defeating Milos Raonic 7–6(9–7), 6–7(11–13), 7–5 in the final. Roddick made a diving forehand to break serve for the match on his fifth championship point. Roddick stated: "That's the best shot I've ever hit in my life, considering the circumstance."

Seeds

Qualifying

Draw

Finals

Top half

Bottom half

References

External links
 Main draw
 Qualifying draw

2011 ATP World Tour
Singles